Maillard is a surname. Notable people with the surname include:

 Armand Maillard (b.1943), French Catholic church archbishop
 Carol Lynn Maillard (b.1951), African-American actress, singer, and composer
 Chantal Maillard (b.1951), Spanish poet and philosopher
 Charles-Thomas Maillard De Tournon (1668–1710), papal legate and cardinal
 Edmond Maillard (1896–1969), Chilean cyclist
 Jean Maillard (c.1515–after 1570), French composer
 Jean-Cristophe Maillard, founder of American band Grand Baton
 Jean de Maillard (b.1951), French magistrate
 Keith Maillard (b.1942), Canadian-American novelist, poet, and professor
 Kenneth Maillard (b.1972), Mauritian accountant
 Louis Maillard (astronomer) (1867–1938), French-born Swiss astronomer and professor
 Louis Camille Maillard (1878–1936), French physician and chemist
 Oliver Maillard (c.1430–1502), Breton Franciscan preacher
 Pierre Maillard (c.1710–1762), French-born Roman Catholic priest
 Pierre-Yves Maillard (b.1968), Swiss politician
 Stanislas-Marie Maillard (1763–1794), captain of the Bastille Volunteers
 Sébastien Maillard (b.1981), French hurdler
 Sylvain Maillard (b.1974), French politician
 William Job Maillard (1863–1903), English recipient of the Victoria Cross

See also
Maillard (disambiguation)

Surnames of French origin